José Navarro may refer to:

Sports

Association football (soccer)
 José Navarro (footballer, born 1948), Peruvian soccer player
 Pepe Navarro (born 1950), Spanish football manager
 Coco Navarro (born 1995), American soccer player
 José Navarro (footballer, born 2003), Mexican soccer player

Other sports
 José Navarro, Count of Casa Loja (1897–1974), Spanish equestrian
 José Luis Navarro (born 1962), Spanish cyclist
 José Navarro (boxer) (born 1981), American flyweight boxer
 José Juan Navarro (born 1981), Spanish weightlifter

Others
 José Navarro (painter) (1867–1923), Spanish painter
 José Ángel Navarro (elder) (1784–1836), Mexican politician in Spanish Texas
 José Antonio Navarro (1795–1871), Texas revolutionary and statesman, U.S.
 José Ángel Navarro III (1828–1876), representative in Texas Legislature, U.S.
 Josep Navarro Santaeulàlia (born 1955), Catalan writer and poet

Other uses
 Casa Navarro State Historic Site, American historic site in San Antonio, Texas